Felicia Gail Cummings (born  20 February 1968) is a Trinidadian former cricketer who played as a slow left-arm orthodox bowler. She appeared in 1 Test match and 14 One Day Internationals for the West Indies, and was part of their squad at the 2005 Women's Cricket World Cup. She played domestic cricket for Trinidad and Tobago.

References

External links
 
 

1968 births
Living people
West Indies women One Day International cricketers
Trinidad and Tobago women cricketers
West Indies women Test cricketers
West Indian women cricketers